Max Reed Spilsbury (June 16, 1924 – November 21, 2001) was an American football player and coach. He served as the head football coach at Northern Arizona University–then known as Arizona State College at Flagstaff–from 1956 to 1964, compiling a record of 58–25–5.

Spilsbury was the father of actor Klinton Spilsbury.

Head coaching record

References

External links
 

1924 births
2001 deaths
Arizona Wildcats football coaches
Arizona Wildcats football players
Northern Arizona Lumberjacks football coaches
High school football coaches in Arizona
People from Grant County, New Mexico
Players of American football from New Mexico